Bon Kuh-e Sofla (also Romanized as Bon Kūh-e Soflá; also known as Bon Kūh Pā’īn and Ponkūh) is a village in Rezvan Rural District, Jebalbarez District, Jiroft County, Kerman Province, Iran. At the 2006 census, its population was 99, in 21 families.

References 

Populated places in Jiroft County